Patrick Clair Knight (born September 21, 1970) is an American basketball coach and scout. He is a scout for the Indiana Pacers of the National Basketball Association (NBA). Knight assumed his position on July 1, 2014, and is the Pacers' college scout for the West Coast Region.

Formerly, he was an American college basketball coach. He became the coach of the Lamar Cardinals basketball team on April 5, 2011, but was fired on February 16, 2014. He was previously the head coach of the Texas Tech Red Raiders men's basketball team until March 7, 2011. Prior to that, he served in other coaching, administrative and scouting capacities with the NBA, United States Basketball League, International Basketball Association, NCAA, and CBA teams. Knight is the son of Basketball Hall of Fame member Bob Knight, and replaced his father as Texas Tech's 13th head coach on February 4, 2008.

Biography

Playing career
Knight played basketball at Bloomington High School North and then went on to play college basketball for the Indiana University Hoosiers from 1990 to 1995 under his father, lettering during four seasons. From 1991–93, the Hoosiers posted 87 victories, the most by any Big Ten team in a three-year span, breaking the mark of 86 set by Bob Knight's Indiana teams of 1974–76. During the 1991-92 season, as Knight redshirted, they reached the Final Four. During the 1992-93 season, the 31-4 Hoosiers won the Big Ten and finished the season at the top of the AP Poll, but were defeated by Kansas in the Elite Eight. Knight scored 138 points in 112 games played, a 1.2 points-per-game average. Knight graduated in 1995 with a degree in sports management.

Coaching career
Knight was head coach of the Wisconsin Blast of the International Basketball Association and the Columbus Cagerz of the United States Basketball League before taking assistant coaching positions at Indiana, Akron and Texas Tech. He was also an administrative assistant and scout with the NBA's Phoenix Suns and an assistant coach with the Connecticut Pride of the Continental Basketball Association.

Texas Tech

In 2005,  Knight was designated to succeed his father as head coach of the Texas Tech Red Raiders, assuming that role on February 4, 2008 when his father abruptly retired. Pat Knight has used the motion offense and man-to-man defense, both of which he learned from his father as a player at Indiana and as an assistant coach.

After taking the head coaching job midseason, his initial two games were defeats on the road. The first was
an 80–74 loss to Baylor on February 6, 2008. The second came three days later at Nebraska. Knight's first head coaching win came at home when the Red Raiders upset #18 Kansas State, 84–75, at United Spirit Arena. Going into the game, KSU was in sole possession of first place in the Big 12. The win came on what had earlier been declared Pat Knight Day by Lubbock mayor David Miller. On March 1, 2008, the Red Raiders again defeated the top team in the conference by beating #5 Texas, 83–80, ending a month-long, eight-game winning streak for the Longhorns.

The Red Raiders finished the regular season with back-to-back losses, first at Kansas and then to Baylor. At the 2008 Big 12 men's basketball tournament, they added another loss, to Oklahoma State, in the first round. The team did not receive an invitation to play at either the NCAA Men's Division I Basketball Championship or at the National Invitation Tournament. Texas Tech did get an invitation to the inaugural College Basketball Invitational, but declined the offer.

In the third game of the 2008–09 season, Tech defeated Division II opponent East Central University 167–115, setting a new school record for most points scored in a game. The previous record of 128 was set in the double overtime victory over Texas on February 20, 1994. The combined total of 282 points also became a new record.

During the 2008–09 season, Knight was reprimanded twice for altercations with officials. In a home game against Nebraska, Knight ran onto the court to argue with officials after Texas Tech player Alan Voskuil was called for a foul. After receiving two technical fouls, Knight was ejected from the game. Once in the tunnel, Knight ran back onto the court to continue arguing. Knight was not suspended, but received a public reprimand instead from the Big 12 Conference. Less than a month later, Knight was then suspended one game for his criticism of officiating in a loss against Texas A&M on February 23, 2009.

On March 7, 2011, Texas Tech fired Pat Knight after 3 disappointing seasons of conference play.

Lamar
On April 5, 2011, Lamar University hired Pat Knight as head coach.

On February 23, 2012 during a post-game press conference following a 62–52 loss to Stephen F. Austin State University, Knight berated his team's seniors, saying that, in his opinion, they were the worst group of seniors he'd ever coached. The Lamar squad went on to win the final three games of the season and the Southland Conference East Division Championship. Though Knight never apologized for his comments, he said he was proud of the way his seniors responded after the criticism. "They're the ones that deserve the credit," he said. Knight led Lamar to its first 20-win season since 1988 and a third-place finish in the conference. Lamar would go on to win the Southland Conference Tournament and earn their first NCAA appearance since 2000. Lamar qualified to play one of the "First Four" opening round games, but lost to Vermont. In a post-game interview, Knight tearfully complimented his seniors, calling them the "under-the-bus-gang," referring to his earlier criticism of them.

The following season, after those seniors graduated, Knight led Lamar to a 3–28 season (a .107 winning percentage) in 2012–13. He experienced similar difficulty in 2013–14, coaching the Cardinals to a 3–22 record. With five games still remaining on the season schedule, he was fired on February 16, 2014.

Coaching record

 
 
* Knight became coach midway through the season

 

Source:

Personal life
Knight and the former Amanda Shaw were married on May 10, 2002.

References

1970 births
Living people
American basketball scouts
American men's basketball coaches
American men's basketball players
Basketball coaches from Indiana
Basketball players from Indiana
College men's basketball head coaches in the United States
Continental Basketball Association coaches
Indiana Hoosiers men's basketball coaches
Indiana Hoosiers men's basketball players
Indiana Pacers scouts
Lamar Cardinals basketball coaches
Place of birth missing (living people)
Texas Tech Red Raiders basketball coaches
United States Basketball League coaches